Paul Josef Cordes (born 5 September 1934) is a German cardinal of the Roman Catholic Church. He served as president of the Pontifical Council Cor Unum (1995–2010), and was elevated to the rank of cardinal in 2007.

Biography

Youth
Cordes was born in Kirchhundem, and graduated from the gymnasium of Attendorn in 1955. He studied medicine for two semesters in Münster, and philosophy at the Philosophical Faculty of Paderborn as well as in Lyon, France. After studying at the Faculty of Theology Paderborn, Cordes attended the University of Mainz, where he was also an assistant to Professor Karl Lehmann, under whom Cordes was also the first student to defend his thesis ("Sendung zum Dienst. Exegetisch-historische und systematische Studien zum Konzilsdekret 'Über Leben und Dienst der Priester'", 1971).

Priest
Cordes was ordained to the priesthood by Archbishop Lorenz Jäger on 21 December 1961. He then served as prefect of Studienheim Sankt Klemens for late vocations of the dioceses of Paderborn and Münster until 1966. From 1966 to 1969, Cordes was Prefect of Collegium Leonium, the archdiocesan seminary of Paderborn. In 1972, he was called to the secretariat of the Episcopal Conference of Germany, where he served as relator for pastoral affairs.

Bishop
On 27 October 1975, Cordes was appointed Auxiliary bishop of Paderborn and Titular Bishop of Naissus by Pope Paul VI. He received his episcopal consecration on 1 February 1976 from Archbishop Johannes Joachim Degenhardt, with Cardinal Julius Döpfner and Bishop Paul Nordhues serving as co-consecrators, in the Cathedral of Paderborn. Cordes was later named an honorary canon of the cathedral chapter on 20 July 1980.

He entered the service of the Roman Curia upon his appointment as vice-president of the Pontifical Council for the Laity on 11 March 1980. On 2 December 1995, Cordes was made President of Pontifical Council Cor Unum, and he was raised to the rank of archbishop. He served as a special papal envoy to the peoples of Nicaragua, El Salvador, Honduras, and Guatemala, when they were struck by Hurricane Mitch from 29 November to 3 December 1998.

Cardinal
Pope Benedict XVI created him Cardinal-Deacon of S. Lorenzo in Piscibus in the consistory of 24 November 2007.

On 12 June 2008, in addition to his main duties he was appointed by Benedict as a member of congregations in the Roman Curia; these are the Congregation for the Causes of Saints, the Congregation for the Clergy and the Congregation for the Evangelization of Peoples and the Pontifical Council for Justice and Peace. In November 2010 he was also appointed a member of the Congregation for Bishops. He ceased to be a member of these dicasteries on reaching 80 on 5 September 2014.

Views
In an article in the Catholic Herald, Cordes argued that secularization comes from the early 17th century British idea that democracy should be handled as a religious and moral principle, in line with the Reformation idea of the priesthood of all believers. He argued that such a principle would be fatal to the Church if the laymen-centered theology of the Second Vatican Council were to be applied in a similar way. He claimed the German press tried to turn the Williamson affair into a Benedict affair.

References

External links
 
Catholic-Hierarchy 
Cardinals of the Holy Roman Church
Catholic-pages bio

1934 births
Living people
Johannes Gutenberg University Mainz alumni
German Roman Catholic titular bishops
21st-century Roman Catholic titular archbishops
21st-century German cardinals
Pontifical Council Cor Unum
Cardinals created by Pope Benedict XVI
Knights Commander of the Order of Merit of the Federal Republic of Germany
Members of the Congregation for the Causes of Saints
Members of the Congregation for the Clergy
Members of the Congregation for the Evangelization of Peoples
Members of the Congregation for Bishops
Roman Catholic bishops of Paderborn